Aldebaran is a 1935 Italian drama film directed by Alessandro Blasetti and starring Gino Cervi, Evi Maltagliati and Gianfranco Giachetti. The film was a naval melodrama, an attempt by Blasetti to make a more commercial film following the difficulties encountered with the propagandist The Old Guard (1934).

Plot
After a couple of projects had either been postponed or fallen through for Blasetti, it was suggested that he should make a film about the navy in peacetime. The result is this strange film, which at the outset plays like a propaganda piece for the might of the Italian navy, only to veer off into high melodrama, as it zeroes in on Commander Corrado Valeri (Gino Cervi), and his conflict between duty and the jealousy of his wife. There are comedic asides, a visit to a North African club, affording Blasetti to contribute the first scenes of nudity in Italian film, and there are moments of heroism, including a mission to rescue the doomed crew of a wrecked submarine. As if all of that was not more than enough, the film features a star-studded cast including Evi Maltagliati, Gianfranco Giachetti, Doris Duranti, Elisa Cegani (in her debut), and even a brief cameo by Blasetti himself.

Cast 
 Gino Cervi as Cmdr. Corrado Valeri 
 Evi Maltagliati as Anna Weiss 
 Gianfranco Giachetti as Adm. Claudio Valeri 
 Egisto Olivieri as Cmdr. Stefano Devon 
 Elisa Cegani as Nora Bandi 
 Gianpaolo Rosmino as Luigi Bandi 
 Ugo Ceseri as Bertrame 
 Franco Coop as Chief quartermaster Gennarino 
 Umberto Sacripante as Seaman Stella 
 Vittorio Vaser as Rocchi 
 Doris Duranti as Anna's friend 
 Gemma Bolognesi as Giuditta 
 Rosina Anselmi as Orsolina 
 Ermanno Roveri as Solinas 
 Piero Pastore as Sailor 
 Aristide Garbini as Assist. boatswain 
 Vasco Creti as Captain of the Titan 
  as Young boy 
 Mario Steni as Lt. Silich 
 Luigi Pavese as Nora's friend 
 Tatiana Pavoni as Carlotta 
 Silvia Melandri as Elsa 
 Dina Romano as Fortunato's mother 
 Romolo Costa as Fortunato's brother 
 Alessandro Blasetti as Radio operator

References

Bibliography 
 Moliterno, Gino. Historical Dictionary of Italian Cinema. Scarecrow Press, 2008.

External links 
 

1935 films
Italian drama films
Italian black-and-white films
1935 drama films
1930s Italian-language films
Films directed by Alessandro Blasetti
Seafaring films
Films set in the Mediterranean Sea
1930s Italian films